Alberto Ciaramella (born 1947) is an Italian computer engineer and scientist. He is notable for extensive pioneering contributions in the field of speech technologies and applied natural language processing, most of them at CSELT and Loquendo, with the amount of 40 papers and four patents.

Biography 
Ciaramella obtained the Laurea in Electronic Engineering and the Post-Laurea in 1969 at La Sapienza University in Rome with prof. Antonio Ruberti as supervisor of his thesis. Then, he joined CSELT as a research engineer.

In 1975 he patented at CSELT one of the first architecture-independent bootstrap devices that allowed the Gruppi Speciali (the first electronic Italian telephone switch and the most advanced project in Italian in the seventies) to start up by pushing a single button from a ROM memory in case of failure.

During the 80s Ciaramella took part in some European projects (Esprit P26, SUNDIAL) in the pioneering field of speech recognition and dialogue systems on many European languages, such as Italian, during which he proposed a method to evaluate the quality of the dialogue systems by comparing the meanings.

In 1983 he co-authored one of the first international patents on speaker recognition, a new research field at that time, applied commercially in a speech recognition software licensed by CSELT.

In 1990 he co-authored one of the first international patents of a real-time speech recognition system integrated in a microprocessor suitable for being used by a Telecommunication company: the microprocessor was named RIPAC (Riconoscitore di Parlato Connesso - as stated in the patent description itself).

Extensive research was conducted on the Hidden Markov Model aimed to speech recognition tasks, by using small such as big dictionaries and applied to many cases - e.g. the recognition of the children's voice, or browser navigation by voice. Other contributions include test and proposals in international communication standards, such as VoiceXML.

In 2001 the CSELT's voice technology group became Loquendo and Alberto Ciaramella became Competitive intelligence supervisor of the company.

In 2005 Ciaramella founded IntelliSemantic at the Incubator of Politecnico di Torino, an innovative company that works in the field of Competitive Business Intelligence. Also within his present company, he continues the research in the field of the applied language technologies. In 2010 he co-authored a paper about his view about the application of the emerging "semantic" technologies to the patent analysis, which became popular in the field of Patent Informatics, and took part in Topas European project focused on patent summarization.

Bibliography 
 Billi, R., Canavesio, F., Ciaramella, A., & Nebbia, L. (1994, September). Interactive voice technology at work: The CSELT experience. In Interactive Voice Technology for Telecommunications Applications, 1994., Second IEEE Workshop on (pp. 43–48). IEEE.
 Pirani, Giancarlo, ed. Advanced algorithms and architectures for speech understanding. Vol. 1. Springer Science & Business Media, 2013. 
 Billi, Roberto, ed. Tecnologie vocali per l'interazione uomo-macchina. Nuovi servizi a portata di voce, CSELT, 1995, . (Italian)

References

External links 
A bit of History: Alberto Ciaramella Biography (in Italian)

Living people
Italian computer scientists
20th-century Italian engineers
Sapienza University of Rome alumni
20th-century Italian inventors
1947 births